Frans Gösta Brodin (15 February 1908 – 18 June 1979) was a Swedish sailor who competed in the 1948 Summer Olympics.

In 1948 he won the silver medal as a crew member of the Swedish boat Slaghöken in the Dragon class.

References 
 

1908 births
1979 deaths
Swedish male sailors (sport)
Olympic sailors of Sweden
Sailors at the 1948 Summer Olympics – Dragon
Olympic silver medalists for Sweden
Olympic medalists in sailing

Medalists at the 1948 Summer Olympics
20th-century Swedish people